Yantongtun is a town located in the Dorbod Mongol Autonomous County of Daqing, Heilongjiang, China.

References

Township-level divisions of Shaanxi